Markos Vasilakis (born 26 April 1965, Chios) is the Greek Orthodox metropolitan bishop of Chios, Psara, and Oinousses, Greece. He is a graduate of the Department of Philology and the Department of Theology of National and Kapodistrian University of Athens.

Notes 

Bishops of the Church of Greece
1965 births
Greek Orthodox bishops of Chios
National and Kapodistrian University of Athens alumni
Living people
Clergy from Chios